William Keen (born 1792 at Godalming, Surrey; died 26 June 1846 at Godalming) was an English amateur cricketer who played first-class cricket from 1821 to 1831.  He was mainly associated with Surrey and made 28 known appearances in first-class matches, including three for the Gentlemen between 1824 and 1830.

References

External links

Bibliography
 Arthur Haygarth, Scores & Biographies, Volumes 1-2 (1744–1840), Lillywhite, 1862

1792 births
1846 deaths
English cricketers
English cricketers of 1787 to 1825
English cricketers of 1826 to 1863
Surrey cricketers
Gentlemen cricketers
Sussex cricketers
Godalming Cricket Club cricketers
People from Godalming